Harbor Hill was a large Long Island mansion built from 1899 to 1902 in Roslyn, New York, for telecommunications magnate Clarence Hungerford Mackay. It was designed by McKim, Mead & White, with Stanford White supervising the project - the largest private residence he ever designed.

The home was built atop  Harbor Hill, the highest point in Nassau County, New York, and demolished in 1949.

History

Clarence Mackay (1874–1938) was the son of Comstock Lode magnate John William Mackay, and inherited much of an estimated $500 million fortune upon his father's death in 1902 (approximately $13 billion in 2012 dollars). White collaborated closely with Clarence Mackay's wife, Katharine Duer Mackay (1880–1930), and with her approval based the main façade of Harbor Hill upon that of François Mansart's Château de Maisons of 1642, using a mix of other influences to finish the overall design.

Formal terraces and gardens were finished by Guy Lowell.

Social events held at the house included a grand party for the then Prince of Wales (later Edward VIII and the Duke of Windsor) in 1924.

On June 13, 1927, Charles Lindbergh, accompanied by his mother and the Mayor of New York, was feted at a banquet and dance Mackay held the night of transatlantic aviator's ticker-tape parade on 5th Avenue.

The building was vandalised during World War II, and demolished in 1947. After Harbor Hill was razed; a fountain with four equestrian statues designed by Henri-Léon Gréber was moved to Kansas City, Missouri, where it is displayed adjacent to Country Club Plaza.

Summit
At an elevation of 348 feet Harbor Hill is the highest point in Nassau County, New York. Whether Harbor Hill or 401-foot Jayne's Hill to the east was the highest point on Long Island was a point of some debate in the 19th century, with Harbor Hill often thought to be the higher.  A news report of 1901 reported that Jayne's Hill was actually taller.  Nevertheless, the issue remained contested at least as late as 1938.

Remaining buildings

Much of the estate, including the site of the main building, has been covered with a modern housing development. However, three remaining buildings from the Harbor Hill estate were listed on the National Register of Historic Places in 1991: Mackay Estate Dairyman's Cottage, Mackay Estate Gate Lodge, and Mackay Estate Water Tower.

See also
List of Gilded Age mansions
 "Harbor Hill: Portrait of a House" by Richard Guy Wilson.

References

External links

 Harbor Hill: An Appreciation
 Interior of the house, 1903-1904

Mansions of Gold Coast, Long Island
Houses in Nassau County, New York
Landforms of Nassau County, New York
Landforms of Suffolk County, New York
Hills of New York (state)
Demolished buildings and structures in New York (state)
Châteauesque architecture in the United States
Gilded Age mansions